Mikri Milia is a village of the Pydna-Kolindros municipality. Before the 2011 local government reform it was part of the municipality of Pydna. The 2011 census recorded 32 inhabitants in the village. Mikri Milia is a part of the community of Palaiostani.

See also
 List of settlements in the Pieria regional unit

References

Populated places in Pieria (regional unit)